Shiupur, also spelled Shivpur, is a village in Jagdishpur block of Bhojpur district in Bihar, India. As of 2011, its population was 3,760, in 598 households. It is located northwest of the city of Jagdishpur.

References 

Villages in Bhojpur district, India